The Agrișteu or Senereuș ( or Szénaverős-patak) is a left tributary of the river Târnava Mică in Romania. It flows into the Târnava Mică in the village Agrișteu.

References

Rivers of Romania
Rivers of Mureș County